Armonía "Nya" Quesada (13 April 1919 – 6 December 2013) was an Argentine actress, whose career spanned nearly five decades.

Nya Quesada died of natural causes on 6 December 2013, aged 94, in Buenos Aires.

References

External links

1919 births
2013 deaths
People from Bahía Blanca
Argentine people of Spanish descent
Argentine television actresses
Argentine film actresses
Argentine stage actresses
20th-century Argentine actresses
21st-century Argentine actresses
Burials at La Chacarita Cemetery